Great Canadian Wrestling (GCW) is an independent professional wrestling promotion company based in Oshawa, Ontario. GCW was founded in 2005 and promotes shows throughout Southern Ontario. The company also hosts since 2005 an annual Great Canadian Wrestling Expo that takes place over several days and brings together a large group of wrestlers. Currently, four championships are defended at GCW events.

GCW events featured a roster of wrestlers who compete regularly for the promotion as well as occasional appearances by wrestlers currently signed with major promotions. In addition, a group of "legends", or veteran wrestlers from other promotions, also would compete on occasion for GCW.

On February 18, 2009, GCW began an online broadcast titled GCWtv.

In November 2015, GCW rebranded itself as Infinity Wrestling.

History
GCW gives out the Ontario Indy Wrestling Awards annually, which is eligible to all wrestling promotions and wrestlers who perform in Ontario.

Wrestling Expo
Beginning in 2005, the promotion's first year, GCW has assembled a group of wrestlers from various promotions to compete in a multi-day event known as the Great Canadian Wrestling Expo. The first Expo attracted 600 visitors and included merchandise sales from a wide variety of vendors, an auction, and opportunities to meet with the wrestlers for autographs and photographs. Ed the Sock was named commissioner for the event and proceeds from the weekend were donated to the Sick Kids Foundation. In 2006, the event was combined with the 10th Annual Anime North Convention. The event featured primarily traditional wrestling matches but also included gimmick matches such as one between wrestlers competing as the Green Power Ranger and the Red Power Ranger for leadership of the Power Rangers, as well as an encounter between Team Sailor Moon and Team Rocket. This cross-promotional event attracted 11,286 paid attendees. Since 2006, GCW has continued to promote a series of shows along with Anime North.

Wrestlers

Although GCW promotes matches with many wrestlers who have not appeared in major promotions, the organization also has an agreement with Total Nonstop Action Wrestling (TNA) that facilitates events titled TNmAyhem, in which wrestlers from TNA compete. The first of these cards took place on May 24, 2007, and features appearances by such wrestlers as Raven, Christopher Daniels, and A.J. Styles. GCW events also feature wrestlers who have gained fame in major American promotions, such as Billy Gunn, The Honky Tonk Man, and Koko B. Ware.

Roster
GCW had a regular group of wrestlers that competed for the promotion; this includes both male and female wrestlers. In addition, many wrestlers made sporadic appearances for the company. On the company roster, GCW divides these occasional performers into two groups: legends (longtime wrestlers, many of whom are semi-retired) and superstars (wrestlers who currently compete, or have recently competed, for major promotions).

Regular roster
GCW's regular roster consisted of wrestlers who competed for the promotion on a regular basis:

W.I.L.D. Division
The W.I.L.D. Division consisted of GCW's female wrestlers:

Championships

GCW National Championship
The GCW National Championship was a professional wrestling championship that serves as the major championship for Great Canadian Wrestling.

GCW Interim Heavyweight Championship

In 2007, GCW National Champion Jake O'Reilly was injured but unwilling to vacate his title. As a result, an eight-man tournament was held to determine the first holder of the newly created GCW Interim Heavyweight Championship. O'Reilly, still holding his National Championship, returned in February 2008, and the two titles were unified when Otis Idol defeated O'Reilly in October 2008.

GCW Ontario Independent Championship
The GCW Ontario Independent Championship is a secondary title in the Great Canadian Wrestling promotion. It was created in May 2006, and a four-man tournament was held to determine the initial champion.

{| class="wikitable sortable" width=100%
!style="background: #e3e3e3;" width=20%|Wrestler:
!style="background: #e3e3e3;" width=0% |Times:
!style="background: #e3e3e3;" width=17%|Date:
!style="background: #e3e3e3;" width=20%|Location:
!class="unsortable" style="background: #e3e3e3;" width=43%|Notes:
|-
| Jimmy Jacobs
| 1
| 
| Oshawa, Ontario
| 
|-
| Kris Chambers
| 1
| 
| Oshawa, Ontario
| 
|-
| Jake O'Reilly
| 1
| 
| Oshawa, Ontario
| {{small|Defeated Kris Chambers at ''Final War}}
|-
| Hayden Avery
| 1
| 
| Oshawa, Ontario
| 
|-
| Cody Deaner
| 1
| 
| Oshawa, Ontario
| 
|-
| Hayden the Destroyer
| 2
| 
| Oshawa, Ontario
| 
|-
| Cody 45
| 1
| 
| Oshawa, Ontario
| 
|-
| Xtremo
| 1
| 
| Oshawa, Ontario
| 
|-
| Phil Atlas
| 1
| 
| Oshawa, Ontario
| 
|-
| Brad 'Freakin' Martin
| 1
| 
| Oshawa, Ontario
| 
|-
| Tiger Star
| 1
| 
| Oshawa, Ontario
| 
|-
| RJ City
| 1
| 
| Oshawa, Ontario
| 
|-
| Rico Montana
| 1
| 
| Oshawa, Ontario
| 
|-
|Vacated
|
| 
| Oshawa, Ontario
| 
|-
| Cody Deaner
| 2
| 
| Oshawa, Ontario
|
|}

GCW Tag Team Championship
The GCW Tag Team Championship was a championship that serves as the major tag team championship in the Great Canadian Wrestling promotion.

GCW WILD Championship
The GCW WILD Championship''' is a professional wrestling championship that serves as the major women's championship in the Great Canadian Wrestling promotion.

References

External links
GCWE.ca – official website
CanadianWrestlingExpo.com – official website (old URL)
Event results at Online World of Wrestling
Ontario Indy Wrestling Photos and current news at Ontario Indy Wrestling

Canadian professional wrestling promotions
Professional wrestling in Ontario